A centered cube number is a centered figurate number that counts the number of points in a three-dimensional pattern formed by a point surrounded by concentric cubical layers of points, with  points on the square faces of the th layer. Equivalently, it is the number of points in a body-centered cubic pattern within a cube that has  points along each of its edges.

The first few centered cube numbers are

1, 9, 35, 91, 189, 341, 559, 855, 1241, 1729, 2331, 3059, 3925, 4941, 6119, 7471, 9009, ... .

Formulas
The centered cube number for a pattern with  concentric layers around the central point is given by the formula

The same number can also be expressed as a trapezoidal number (difference of two triangular numbers), or a sum of consecutive numbers, as

Properties
Because of the factorization , it is impossible for a centered cube number to be a prime number.
The only centered cube numbers which are also the square numbers are 1 and 9, which can be shown by solving , the only integer solutions being (x,y) from {(0,0), (1,2), (3,6), (12,42)}, By substituting a=(x-1)/2 and b=y/2, we obtain x^2=2y^3+3y^2+3y+1. This gives only (a,b) from {(-1/2,0), (0,1), (1,3), (11/2,21)} where a,b are half-integers.

See also
 Cube number

References

External links

Figurate numbers